The 2009 Saint Paul mayoral election in the U.S. state of Minnesota held a scheduled primary election on 15 September and a general election on 3 November.

Primary Results 
The top two getters advanced to the November 3rd general election.

General Election Results

References

Mayoral elections in Saint Paul, Minnesota
Saint Paul